Q car may refer to:
 Sleeper (car), a car that has high performance and an unassuming exterior
 Q Carinae, a star in the constellation Carina
 V337 Carinae, also designated q Carinae, a variable star in the constellation Carina
 Q-type Queens car (New York City Subway car)